"Good Life"  is a song by American pop rock band OneRepublic, taken from their second studio album, Waking Up (2009). The song was written by group members Ryan Tedder, Brent Kutzle, and Eddie Fisher along with group associate Noel Zancanella. It was produced by Tedder, with co-production by Kutzle and Zancanella.

The song was released on November 19, 2010, as the album's third single in the United States, and as its overall fourth single. Its popularity was increased by its use in various films, television series and advertisements. The single was a commercial success, peaking at number 8 on the US Billboard Hot 100 and eventually being certified multi-platinum, as well as reaching the top twenty of other music charts across Europe, Australia, and New Zealand.  The song has sold over 3 million copies in the US as of January 2014.

Critical reception of "Good Life" was generally positive. This song is unique in that the band recorded various radio versions of this song for different cities and states. The line changed in the lyrics is "my friends in [city/state] they don't know, where I've been."

A remix of the song, featuring American rapper B.o.B, was released to radio stations in June 2011.

Promotion
Initially released as a single in November 2010, the song's popularity was increased after its use in various media. Google used the song in its 2010 Zeitgeist "year in review" video. The song is featured in the trailers for the films Eat Pray Love and One Day, in the film Easy A, and in the television series One Tree Hill, Cougar Town, Gossip Girl, Rookie Blue, America's Got Talent and 90210. The group performed the song at the 2011 Teen Choice Awards, 2011 Billboard Music Awards, American Music Awards of 2011, Live with Regis and Kelly, Dancing with the Stars, and recently at the 2011 Disney Parks Christmas Day Parade, and again in the MTV Music Evolution Manila 2016. The background music of this song was played on various Walt Disney World television and radio commercials. In August 2012, "Good Life" was featured in a Honda Summer Clearance Event commercial.

Critical reception
Giving the song five stars, About.com wrote, "Not only does "Good Life" have lyrics that anyone can relate to — "... what the hell is there to complain about ..." — it also has a unique musical delivery that allows the song to stand out on a radio full of same-sounding songs." Rolling Stone put the song on its list of the 15 Best Whistling Songs of All Time.

Music video

The music video for "Good Life" was premiered on February 14, 2011. The video shows the band performing the song in a field, processed to look like an old film using the stop motion principle. Most of the scenes are processed to look like stop motion. It shows many different symbols and is a bit different from their previous videos. The original video was filmed in a mountain valley located in West Hills, California. It features cameo appearances by Cate Blanchett,  Anne Hathaway,  Nicolas Cage, Russell Crowe, and many more. The music video currently has over 200 million views.

In December 2011, a second music video, filmed entirely at Magic Kingdom in Walt Disney World was released. It features the band performing at Cinderella Castle, as well as riding on several attractions.

Track listing
CD single Digital download
"Good Life" (new mix version) – 4:05
"Good Life" (Demolition Crew remix) – 4:12

Digital download — remix
"Good Life" (featuring B.o.B) – 3:50

Charts

Weekly charts

Year-end charts

Certifications

|-

Release history

References

2011 singles
2009 songs
Interscope Records singles
Mosley Music Group singles
OneRepublic songs
Song recordings produced by Noel Zancanella
Song recordings produced by Ryan Tedder
Songs written by Brent Kutzle
Songs written by Noel Zancanella
Songs written by Ryan Tedder
Songs written by Eddie Fisher (drummer)